Ville-Marie is the name of a borough (arrondissement) in the centre of Montreal, Quebec. The borough is named after Fort Ville-Marie, the French settlement that would later become Montreal (now Old Montreal), which was located within the present-day borough. Old Montreal is a National Historic Site of Canada.

The borough comprises all of downtown Montreal, including the Quartier des spectacles; Old Montreal and the Old Port; the Centre-Sud area; most of Mount Royal Park as well as Saint Helen's Island and Île Notre-Dame.

Geography
It is bordered by the city of Westmount (along Atwater Avenue) to the west and the boroughs of Le Sud-Ouest (along the Autoroute Ville-Marie, Guy and Notre-Dame streets, and the Bonaventure Autoroute) to the southwest, Mercier–Hochelaga-Maisonneuve (along the CP rail lines) to the east, Le Plateau-Mont-Royal (along Sherbrooke, University streets, and Pine and Park avenues) to the northeast, and Outremont and Côte-des-Neiges—Notre-Dame-de-Grâce (along the border of Mount Royal Park) to the north. It is bounded on the south by the Saint Lawrence River.

Government

Municipal
{| class="wikitable" border="1"
! District
! Position
! Name
! width="30px" |  
! Party
|-
| —
| Borough mayor(as mayor of Montreal)
| Valérie Plante
|  |  
| Projet Montréal
|-
| Peter-McGill
| City councillor
| Serge Sasseville
|  |  
| Ensemble Montréal
|-
| Saint-Jacques
| City councillor
| Robert Beaudry
|  |  
| Projet Montréal
|-
| Sainte-Marie
| City councillor
| Sophie Mauzerolle
|  |  
| Projet Montréal
|-
| rowspan=2 | —
| rowspan=2 | Borough councillors(appointed by the mayorfrom Montreal City Council)
| Vicki Grondin<span style="font-size:100%;"></span>
|  |  
| Projet Montréal
|-
| Alia Hassan-Cournol
|  |  
| Projet Montréal
|}
As of 2009, the office of borough mayor, rather than being elected by the borough's citizens, is held ex officio by the mayor of Montreal. Also, two of the members of the borough council are city councillors from other boroughs, chosen by the mayor.

Rather than a dedicated borough hall, the borough's offices and council chambers are located in the Place Dupuis office tower at 800 De Maisonneuve Boulevard East.

This governing structure is due to the unique status of Ville-Marie as the centre of Montreal.

Federal and Provincial
The borough is divided among the following federal ridings:

 Ville-Marie—Le Sud-Ouest—Île-des-Sœurs
 Laurier—Sainte-Marie
 Outremont

It is divided among the following provincial electoral districts:

 Westmount–Saint-Louis
 Sainte-Marie–Saint-Jacques
 Hochelaga-Maisonneuve (small corner in east)
 Saint-Henri–Sainte-Anne (small corner in south-west)
 Outremont (three small corners of Mount Royal Park to the borough's north-west)

Demographics

Neighbourhoods
Ville-Marie includes the city's downtown, the historical district of Old Montreal, Le Quartier Chinois, the Gay Village, the Latin Quarter, the recently gentrified Quartier international and Cité Multimédia as well as the Quartier des Spectacles which is newly developed. Other neighbourhoods of interest in the borough include the affluent Golden Square Mile and Îlot-Trafalgar-Gleneagles at the foot of Mount Royal and the Shaughnessy Village/Quartier Concordia area home to thousands of students at Concordia University. The borough also comprises most of Mount Royal Park, Cité du Havre, Saint Helen's Island, and Île Notre-Dame.

Transportation
Montreal's interurban rail and bus terminals, and its two commuter rail terminals (Central Station, Lucien-L'Allier and the Downtown Terminus) are in the borough. It is served by the Orange, Green, and Yellow Lines of the Montreal Metro. The Metro's central station, Berri-UQAM (which is a terminus of the Yellow Line), and the Central Bus Station, are also located in Ville-Marie.

Two autoroutes serve the area: Autoroute Bonaventure and the partly underground Autoroute Ville-Marie. Two bridges — the Victoria Bridge and Jacques-Cartier Bridge — provide access to the South Shore, while the Pont de la Concorde provides access to Saint Helen's Island and Notre Dame Island (Parc Jean-Drapeau). The Jacques-Cartier Bridge also provides access to Saint Helen's Island and Notre Dame Island.

Attractions

Many of Montreal's most famous attractions are situated in Ville-Marie. Most of its office towers, including 1000 de La Gauchetière, 1250 René-Lévesque, the Tour de la Bourse, Place Ville-Marie, the Sun Life Building, the Maison Radio-Canada, and many others are located here.

Three of Montreal's four universities — McGill, Concordia, and UQAM — are located in Ville-Marie, as are three of its four basilicas — Mary, Queen of the World Cathedral, Notre-Dame Basilica, and St. Patrick's Basilica. Cultural infrastructure includes Grande Bibliothèque du Québec, Place des Arts, the Montreal Museum of Fine Arts, the Quartier des spectacles, the Montreal Science Centre, Pointe-à-Callière Museum, Musée Grévin Montreal, and numerous other important venues.

Sports complexes include the Bell Centre, home of the Montreal Canadiens; the Percival Molson Stadium, home of the Montreal Alouettes; and the Circuit Gilles Villeneuve on Île Notre-Dame, site of the Canadian Grand Prix.

Hospitals include the Centre hospitalier de l'Université de Montréal (CHUM) megahospital, opened in 2017, as well as the Montreal General Hospital and Hôpital Notre-Dame.

Major parks and recreation areas include Mount Royal and its park, Parc Jean-Drapeau (the site of Expo 67), Dorchester Square and Place du Canada, and the Old Port.

The Montreal Public Libraries Network operates the Frontenac and Père-Ambroise libraries in the eastern part of the borough.

Economy
As Ville-Marie contains Montreal's central business district, numerous companies are headquartered or have major regional offices in the borough, including Bombardier Aerospace.

Education
The Commission scolaire de Montréal (CSDM) operates French-language public schools.

 Elementary 
 École Marguerite-Bourgeoys École Garneau 
 École Champlain École Jean-Baptiste-Meilleur École Saint-Anselme Specialized 
 École des métiers de la restauration et du tourisme de Montréal École des métiers des Faubourgs-de-Montréal École Éducation pour Adultes Centre Lartigue École Éducation pour Adultes Centre Gédéon-OuimetThe English Montreal School Board (EMSB) operates English-language schools.

 Elementary 
 F.A.C.E. Elementary School (jointly run with the CSDM)

 High school 
 F.A.C.E. High School'' (jointly run with the CSDM)

See also
 Boroughs of Montreal
 Districts of Montreal
 Municipal reorganization in Quebec

References

External links

 Borough's website (in French for now)

Ville-Marie, Montreal
Boroughs of Montreal
Academic enclaves